Peam Chor is a district located in Prey Veng Province, in south eastern Cambodia.

Administrative divisions
The district contains 10 communes:

Angkor Angk 
Kampong Prasat 
Kaoh Chek
Kaoh Roka 
Kaoh Sampov 
Krang Ta Yang 
Preaek Krabau 
Preaek Sambuor 
Ruessei Srok
Svay Phluoh

References 

Districts of Prey Veng province